KEUV-LD (channel 35) is a low-power television station in Eureka, California, United States, affiliated with the Spanish-language Univision network. It is owned by Sinclair Broadcast Group alongside low-power dual CW+/MyNetworkTV affiliate KECA-LD (channel 29) and Arcata-licensed ABC affiliate KAEF-TV (channel 23). Sinclair also operates Eureka-licensed Fox affiliate KBVU (channel 28) under a local marketing agreement (LMA) with Cunningham Broadcasting; however, Sinclair effectively owns KBVU as the majority of Cunningham's stock is owned by the family of deceased group founder Julian Smith. The four stations share studios on Sixth Street in downtown Eureka; KEUV-LD's transmitter is located along Barry Road southeast of Eureka.

Although identifying as a separate station in its own right, KEUV-LD is considered a semi-satellite of KUCO-LD (channel 27) in Chico. It simulcasts all Univision network programming as provided by its parent but airs separate local commercials and station identifications. Master control operations are based at the facilities of sister station and ABC affiliate KRCR-TV (channel 7) on Auditorium Drive in Redding.

History

KEUV was founded in 1994 by Sainte Partners II, L.P. It is the first and only Spanish-language television station in Eureka.

On April 21, 2017, Sinclair Broadcast Group purchased KBVU as part of a four-station deal. The sale was completed September 1.

In spring 2020, KEUV-LP turned off its analog signal and flash cut to digital on channel 31. The station was licensed for digital operation on April 5, 2021, changing its call sign to KEUV-LD.

Technical information

Subchannel

Translator

References

EUV-LD
Television channels and stations established in 1994
1994 establishments in California
Univision network affiliates
EUV-LD
Sinclair Broadcast Group
Low-power television stations in the United States